Polyanthus may refer to:
HMS Polyanthus (K47), a warship
A locomotive of the GWR 4100 Class
Cultivars of the hybrid species Primula × polyantha
A horse in the 1836 Grand Liverpool Steeplechase
A synonym of the plant genus Pleioblastus.

See also 
Polyanthos (disambiguation)